Biathlon at the 2016 Winter Youth Olympics took place at the Birkebeineren Ski Stadium in Lillehammer, Norway.

Events

Medal table

Boys' events

Girls' events

Mixed events

References

External links
Results Book – Biathlon

 
2016 in biathlon
2016 Winter Youth Olympics events
2016
Youth Olympics